Pha Nok Khao is a tambon (subdistrict) of Phu Kradueng District, Loei Province.

Toponymy
Pha Nok Khao is well known as "Gateway to Phu Kradueng", a well known  natural attraction of Loei Province. Pha Nok Khao is a local steep cliff that resembles an owl. Hence the name (Pha is cliff or mountain, Nok Khao is owl). The cliff resembles a beak pointing upwards, looks like a crest. Next, below is a round stone that curves low from the crest down to the head. It is outstanding cliff on the side of the road (Highway 12 and 201, also known as Maliwan Road) between two provinces of Isan region, Khon Kaen and Loei.
 
Owing it is the way up to Phu Kradueng, so it has restaurants and cafés available to tourists. It is also a point to get on and off the bus in itself.

Geography
Pha Nok Khao has a mountainous terrain alternating with plains. Most of the area is in the National Forest. Therefore, there are beautiful scenery, both forests and waterfalls.

It is bounded by other areas (from the north clockwise): Pha Khao in its province, Si Bun Rueang of Nong Bua Lamphu Province and Si Chomphu of Khon Kaen, Huai Som and Phu Kradueng in its district.

Administration
Subdistrict Administrative Organization Pha Nok Khao (SAO Pha Nok Khao) governs areas beyond the jurisdiction of the Phu Kradueng Subdistrict Municipality.

It was also divided into 14 mubans (villages)

The emblem of SAO Pha Nok Khao shows Pha Nok Khao, below is a handshake symbol.

Economy
Sugar cane is a local cash crop.

Notes

External links
 
Tambon of Loei Province